Whitsunday Islands is a national park in Queensland, Australia,  northwest of Brisbane.  It contains Whitsunday Island and 31 others.

Geography

The Whitsunday Islands lie midway along Australia's Queensland coast and are bordered by the Great Barrier Reef and the waters of the Coral Sea. Migrating humpback whales favour the waters around the Whitsunday Islands as a calving ground between May and September each year.  Marine stingers are found in the waters of the islands between October and May.

The region spans from the beaches of Bowen in the north and Laguna Whitsundays in the south. All 74 of the islands are surrounded by the Great Barrier Reef and only eight of them are inhabited.

On Whitsunday Island is the six km long Whitehaven Beach.  The beach has camping and picnic facilities in its foredunes.  A walking track links to Chance Bay.

Access
Access is by private or commercial boat from Airlie Beach or Shute Harbour.

See also

 List of islands of Australia
 Protected areas of Queensland

References

External links

National parks of Queensland
Protected areas established in 1944
North Queensland
1944 establishments in Australia